Frederick IX or Friedrich IX may refer to: 

Frederick IX, Count of Hohenzollern (d. between 1377 and 1379)
Frederick IX, Margrave of Brandenburg (1588–1611)
Frederick IX of Denmark (1899–1972)
Frederick IX Bridge